Aaj Ki Raat is a 2006 Hindi song from the Bollywood film soundtrack for Don: The Chase Begins Again. That film is a remake of the 1978 film, Don. The track is composed by Shankar–Ehsaan–Loy trio with lyrics penned by Javed Akhtar. The song became more popular internationally when later used by AR Rahman in the Academy Award-winning 2008 soundtrack Slumdog Millionaire.

Development
The track falls into the genre of 1980s retro-disco. According to the script of the movie, the song was to be included with Shahrukh Khan, Priyanka Chopra and Isha Koppikar dancing at a private underworld party. Director Farhan Akhtar suggested using a retro rock number. Shankar–Ehsaan–Loy got together with director Farhan Akhtar, who himself was a music enthusiast, to come up with the track which had elements of music styles they listened to in the late 1970s and 1980s. The song fits well in the movie, as the movie in itself is a retro story presented in a modern style.

Ehsaan stated that the song was influenced by the synthpop music of the late 1970s and 1980s, including musicians such as Ultravox and Cerrone.

Live drums were used for the song and Ehsaan experimented with thin guitar riff's to get the twanginess of The Ventures & The Shadows.

The song was performed by Alisha, Mahalaxmi Iyer & Sonu Nigam.

Reception
The song was well received by the critics. It was featured in the 10 Dances that Made You Flock the Theatres list of Bollywood Hungama. It also did well in the music charts and climbed up later on. The Don soundtrack album became the best-selling Bollywood soundtrack albums of 2006, with 1.5million units sold in India.

Music video

Background

Synopsis 
The song is illustrated with Shahrukh Khan, Priyanka Chopra and Isha Koppikar. The song features three of the stars dancing to the tunes of Aaj Ki Raat in an underground night club where the plot takes an interesting twist. Choreography of the song is done by veteran choreographer Saroj Khan.

Slumdog Millionaire
A version of the song was included in the Academy Award-winning soundtrack Slumdog Millionaire (2008) by A. R. Rahman. The song features in the climax of the film, when the gangsters and mafia boss Javed dance to the tune while "Aaj Ki Raat" plays on the TV, though it shows the music video of Rahman's "Fanaa" from Yuva (2004) being played. The Slumdog Millionaire soundtrack album sold over 2million units worldwide.

References

Songs with music by Shankar–Ehsaan–Loy
Songs with lyrics by Javed Akhtar
Sonu Nigam songs
Alisha Chinai songs
2006 songs